Milton GO Station is the western terminus of GO Transit's Milton line in the Greater Toronto Area, Ontario, Canada. It is located at 780 Main Street East in the Town of Milton, near Main Street and Ontario Street.

Description 
Milton GO Station offers parking for commuters, a station building housing ticket sales and a waiting room, and a bus loop serving GO and Milton Transit buses. Located near Highway 401, it is placed to be accessible to residents of Cambridge, Kitchener, and Waterloo commuting to Toronto, with user having options such as shuttle buses and a park and ride.

A new layover facility (overnight service and storage yard) was built in 2006, and opened at the beginning of 2007 with capacity to store eight 12 car trains. Currently, seven 12 car trains are operated, with an eighth train planned to ease congestion in June, 2012. This facility replaced one located 8 miles west at Guelph Junction in Campbellville, which could not be expanded beyond its five 10 car tracks.

History 
The initial Go Station site layout plans, alongside the proposed Toronto/Milton commuter rail service, was up for public review in 1980, with an open house session to review the service on August 5 1980, in Meadowvale.

Milton Go Station had its inauguration day on October 25 1981, and the inaugural run offered a free ride to Union Station. With service effective Monday on October 26 1981, there were a reported 272 Milton residents using the train line, with the following day increasing to 303 Milton residents, all using the initial three departure times across six stops to Union Station.

Connecting buses
Milton Transit
All of Milton Transit's regular routes start and end at Milton GO Station except for 21 between Milton and Lisgar GO stations
1 Industrial
2 Main (East & West)
3 Trudeau
4 Thompson/Clark
5 Yates
6 Scott
7 Harrison
8 Wilmott
9 Ontario South
10 Farmstead
21 Steeles (starting September 6, 2022)
52 School Special (PM Only)
61 Glen Eden Slopes Express (Winter Seasonal)

GO Transit
 21 Milton/Toronto
 27 Milton/North York

References

External links

Buildings and structures in the Regional Municipality of Halton
GO Transit railway stations
Galt Subdivision
Rail transport in Milton, Ontario
Rail infrastructure in Milton, Ontario
Railway stations in the Regional Municipality of Halton
Railway stations in Canada opened in 1981
1981 establishments in Ontario